Lenox Street is a street-level bus station on the Washington Street branch of the MBTA Silver Line bus rapid transit service. It is located on Washington Street at Lenox Street in the Roxbury neighborhood of Boston, Massachusetts. The stop is served by the SL4 and SL5 Silver Line routes as well as several local MBTA bus routes. Like all Silver Line stops, Lenox Street is accessible.

Silver Line service on Washington Street began on July 20, 2002, replacing the route 49 bus. Service levels doubled on October 13, 2009, with the introduction of the SL4 route.

References

External links

MBTA: Washington St @ Lenox St northbound and southbound

Silver Line (MBTA) stations